Jacob Haussling (February 22, 1855 – February 25, 1921) was the four time Democratic Mayor of Newark, New Jersey who killed himself on February 25, 1921.

Biography
Haussling began his political career in 1888 with an unsuccessful bid to become Sheriff of Essex County, New Jersey.  His second attempt in 1893 was successful, serving one term until being unseated by Republican Henry Meade Doremus in the following 1896 election.  Ten years later, the two men would again vie for the same position, this time, Mayor of Newark.  In this race, however, Haussling was victorious over the two-term mayor Doremus, in large part due to his strong stance against the unpopular "Bishop's Law", which prohibited the operation of saloons on Sundays.

Haussling was re-elected in 1908, 1910, and 1912, until being defeated by Thomas Lynch Raymond in 1914. By his wife's account, the defeat and fall from public favor was difficult on Haussling, who committed suicide nine years later at the age of 66.

References

1855 births
1921 suicides
Mayors of Newark, New Jersey
American politicians who committed suicide
Suicides by sharp instrument in the United States
Suicides in New Jersey